The Watumull Prize (1945–82) was established in 1944 to recognize "the best book on the history of India originally published in the United States".

Recipients

See also

 List of history awards

References

American Historical Association book prizes